Pentacitrotus is a genus of moths belonging to the subfamily Tortricinae of the family Tortricidae.

Species
Pentacitrotus leechi Diakonoff sensu Diakonoff, 1950, 1970
Pentacitrotus maculatus Kawabe, 1993
Pentacitrotus quercivorus Diakonoff, 1950
Pentacitrotus tetrakore (Wileman & Stringer, 1929)
Pentacitrotus vulneratus Butler, 1881

See also
List of Tortricidae genera

References

 , 2005: World catalogue of insects volume 5 Tortricidae.
 , 1881, Illust. typical Specimens Lepid. Heterocera Colln. Br. Mus. 5: 35.
 , 1993: Descriptions of two new species of the Ceracini (Lepidoptera, Tortricidae). Tyô to Ga, 44 (3): 97-100. Abstract and full article: .

External links
tortricidae.com

Ceracini
Tortricidae genera